Ghanghu is a village in Churu district in Rajasthan state of India. This village is associated with Harsh and Jeenmata. One of the oldest villages in Rajasthan, it was a Thikana of Bikaner State in Pre-independence India. It was originally ruled by Chauhans, and later taken over by the Kandhalot Rathores.

Villages in Churu district